Nur zu Besuch: Unplugged im Wiener Burgtheater or Nur zu Besuch: Die Toten Hosen unplugged im Wiener Burgtheater (Only visiting: Unplugged at the Vienna Burgtheater) is a MTV Unplugged album by the German punk band Die Toten Hosen.

Track listing
 "Blitzkrieg Bop" (Dee Dee Ramone, Tommy Ramone) − 2:23 (from Learning English, Lesson One; Ramones cover)
 "Opel-Gang" (von Holst, Frege/Breitkopf, Frege, von Holst, Meurer, Trimpop) − 2:35 (from Opel-Gang)
 "Auswärtsspiel" (Away game) (Frege/Frege) − 3:14 (from Auswärtsspiel)
 "Popmusik" (Pop music) (Frege, Funny van Dannen/van Dannen, Frege) − 2:30
 "Nichts bleibt für die Ewigkeit" (Nothing remains for eternity) (von Holst, Frege/Müller, von Holst, Frege) − 3:25 (from Opium fürs Volk)
 "Hier kommt Alex" (Here comes Alex) (Meurer/Frege) − 4:19 (from Ein kleines bisschen Horrorschau)
 "The Guns of Brixton" (Paul Simonon/Simonon) − 2:38 (The Clash cover)
 "Das Mädchen aus Rottweil" (The girl from Rottweil) (Frege, von Holst/Meurer, Frege) − 3:34 (from Auswärtsspiel)
 "Der letzte Kuss" (The last kiss) (Breitkopf, Meurer/Frege) − 2:44
 "Wünsch dir was" (Make a wish) (Meurer/Frege) − 3:46 (from Kauf MICH!)
 "Der Bofrost-Mann" (The Bofrost man) (van Dannen, Frege/Frege, van Dannen) − 2:42
 "Böser Wolf" (Big Bad Wolf) (von Holst/Frege) − 3:11 (from Opium fürs Volk)
 "Pushed Again" (Breitkopf/Frege) − 4:08 (from Crash-Landing)
 "Weltmeister" (World champion) (von Holst, van Dannen/van Dannen, Frege) − 2:58
 "Alles aus Liebe" (All out of love) (Frege/Frege) − 4:22 (from Kauf MICH!)
 "Freunde" (Friends) (Frege, von Holst/Frege) − 4:26 (from Zurück zum Glück)
 "Nur zu Besuch" (Just visiting) (Frege, von Holst/Frege) − 4:37 (from Auswärtsspiel)
 "Hand in Hand" (Baumann, Götz, Kurtzke, Scholz, Teutoburg-Weiss) − 3:48 (Beatsteaks cover)
 "Eisgekühlter Bommerlunder" (Ice-cold Bommerlunder) (Molinare, Dt.Spez.; Trimpop/Trimpop) − 4:22 (from "Bommerlunder/Opel Gang")
 "Schönen Gruß, auf Wiederseh'n" (Best regards, good bye) (Rohde/Frege) − 3:29 (from Auf dem Kreuzzug ins Glück)

Singles
2005: "Hier kommt Alex (unplugged)"
2006: "The Guns of Brixton (unplugged)"

Personnel
Campino - vocals, kazoo
Andreas von Holst - guitar, banjo
Michael Breitkopf - guitar
Andreas Meurer - bass, double bass
Vom Ritchie - drums
Raphael Zweifel - cello
Esther Kim - piano, accordion

Charts

Weekly charts

Year-end charts

Certifications

Album

Video

References

2005 live albums
Die Toten Hosen live albums
German-language live albums